A milestone is a numbered marker placed on a route such as a road, railway line, canal or boundary. They can indicate the distance to towns, cities, and other places or landmarks; or they can give their position on the route relative to some datum location. On roads they are typically located at the side or in a median or central reservation. They are alternatively known as mile markers (sometimes abbreviated MMs), mileposts or mile posts (sometimes abbreviated MPs). A "kilometric point" is a term used in metricated areas, where distances are commonly measured in kilometres instead of miles. "Distance marker" is a generic unit-agnostic term.

Milestones are installed to provide linear referencing points along the road. This can be used to reassure travellers that the proper path is being followed, and to indicate either distance travelled or the remaining distance to a destination. Such references are also used by maintenance engineers and emergency services to direct them to specific points where their presence is required. This term is sometimes used to denote a location on a road even if no physical sign is present. This is useful for accident reporting and other record keeping (e.g., "an accident occurred at the 13-mile mark" even if the road is only marked with a stone once every 10 miles).

History

Roman Empire 

Milestones (Latin: Miliarium) were originally stone obelisks – made from granite, marble, or whatever local stone was available – and later concrete posts. They were widely used by Roman Empire road builders and were an important part of any Roman road network: the distance travelled per day was only a few miles in some cases. Many Roman milestones only record the name of the reigning emperor without giving any placenames or distances. The first Roman milestones appeared on the Appian way. At the centre of Rome, the "Golden Milestone" was erected to mark the presumed centre of the empire: this milestone has since been lost. The Golden Milestone inspired the Zero Milestone in Washington, D.C., intended as the point from which all road distances in the United States should be reckoned. Odometers were used to measure the Roman milestone spacing, most likely based on Ancient Greek technology.

Byzantine Empire 
A mile-marker monument, the Milion, was erected in the early 4th century AD in Constantinople. It served as the starting point for measurement of distances for all the roads leading to the cities of the Byzantine Empire, and had the same function as the Milliarium Aureum of Ancient Rome. The Milion survived intact until at least the late 15th century. Its fragments were discovered again in the late 1960s. A fragment is re-erected as a pillar.

Islamic civilization 

In Islamic civilisation, use of milestone began in the first Islamic century. The Umayyad caliph Abd al-Malik bin Marwan laid the milestones along the paths that travelers used, and some were found in the city of Faiq in the Syrian Golan, which is, Faiq, one of the main road stations throughout the Islamic ages.  The function of these stones was to guide travelers and introduce them to long distances, as the separation between one and the other was one mile.  Many of these stones were found in more than one location, one in the Islamic Archeology Museum in Istanbul and another in the Jerusalem Museum. A translation of the text written on the stone currently found in the Kasserine Museum in the Golan reads as follows:

Post-Medieval Europe 

In Europe, the distance measured typically starts at specified point within a city or town, as many roads were named for the towns at either end. For example, in London, United Kingdom, a plaque near the Eleanor cross at Charing Cross is the reference point from which distances from London to other towns and cities are measured. In the UK, milestones are especially associated with former turnpike roads.

The British built many milestones on the island of Malta. They consisted of large slabs of local hard rock and they were engraved with the distance to or from a particular location. Many of these were defaced in World War II to disorientate forces in a potential invasion. Despite this, a very small number of milestones still exist undefaced, and one of these is now in the Malta at War Museum.

India

The Kos Minars or Mile Pillars are medieval milestones that were made by the 16th-century Afghan Ruler Sher Shah Suri and later on by Mughal emperors. These Minars were erected by the Mughal Emperors on the main highways across the empire to mark the distance.
Though not architecturally very impressive, being milestones, they were an important part of communication and travel in a large empire.

Kos is an ancient Indian unit of distance. Minar is a Persian word for tower. Abul Fazl recorded in Akbar Nama that in the year 1575 AD, Akbar issued an order that at every Kos on the way from Agra to Ajmer, a pillar or a minar should be erected for the comfort of the travelers.

Modern highways 

The historical term milestone is still used today, even though the "stones" are typically metal highway location markers and in most countries use kilometres and metres rather than miles and yards. Also found today are more closely spaced signs containing fractional numbers, and signs along railways, beaches and canals.

Australia 

Metrication in Australia caused the former mile markers to be gradually replaced with 10 km markers on highways and country roads, which are referred to as "kilometre plates".

Kilometre plates have white text on a trapezoidal green background, and are generally located about a metre above the ground. They have a letter which indicates the town or city they are referring to, and a number, which is the distance in kilometres to that town or city.

Kilometre plates are now generally 5 km apart on major highways and 10 or 20 km apart on less popular or rural highways, though there are many exceptions. Kilometre plates are supplemented by signboards, which display distances to several towns ahead.

Some mile markers are retained as curiosities (see gallery). These include stone markers on Victoria's Glenelg Highway at Delacombe,

Canada 
Usage varies by province, as highways are under provincial jurisdiction. In Alberta, for example, kilometre markers are green metal signs with white lettering, and are generally placed every 4 km starting at the last major intersection to the south or west, depending on whether the route runs north–south or east–west.

India 

Milestones on National highways of India typically have white backgrounds with yellow tops (on national highways) or green tops (on state highways). The names of cities and distances are painted in black. The names of the nearest towns and cities are written along with distance in kilometres. On undivided highways, both sides of the milestones are used, telling the distance to the nearest cities in each direction. The highway number is written on the head of the milestone. The sum of the distances of two nearest cities in each direction from the milestone is listed on the side.

Philippines 

Milestones in the Philippines are found in highways, one kilometer apart, and are found in pairs, one on each side of the road. These are short yellow concrete posts, with two labels on a white background, written in black. On top is a large "K" (or "KM"), and a number, referencing the distance from the Kilometer Zero. While the national Kilometer Zero is in Rizal Park, each major island has its own Kilometer Zero. The milestones on the Luzon mainland reference Rizal Park's Kilometer Zero.

The second label is a letter, standing for the first letter of the next town if you're traveling on that direction, then the distance in kilometers, from the town. On the other side, the milestone there says it's 
 from San Juan.

Most milestones only have labels on one side, facing the driver. Others have labels on all four sides.

United Kingdom 

In the UK, driver location signs are placed every  along each side of motorways, and along some other major roads. They were first introduced in 2003, and they complement distance marker posts, small roadside posts at  intervals, used for road maintenance and administrative purposes. Both types of sign display a unique location number. The number is given without units but is the distance in kilometres from a designated datum location for the road.

United States 

In the U.S. Interstate Highway System, the numbers usually measure the distance to the southern or western state line, or the route's terminus, if the national southern or western terminus lies in that state. The numbering system for other highways varies by state; most use a system mirroring that of the Interstate System, other states, such as Illinois, California, and Kentucky, use the county line as the zero mile marker, while others, including Missouri, do not sign mile-markers at all (except on Interstates). Arizona has a rather unusual system, where a route's mileposts continue those from its original host. Often, the exits are numbered according to the nearest milepost, known as the mile-log system.  From the beginning of the Interstate system until the mid-2000s, most Interstate highways had markers every mile.  Since that time, many states have installed more markers every 0.25 mile, every 0.2 mile, or in some metro areas, every 0.1 mile.  Some historic and scenic routes – such as along the Blue Ridge Parkway in North Carolina and Virginia and the Overseas Highway of the Florida Keys – use mileposts to mark points of interest or (in the cases of many businesses along the Overseas Highway) as a portion of their address.

Myanmar 

In Myanmar, furlongs have been used at least until 2010 in conjunction with miles to indicate distances on highway signs, for example on the Yangon-Mandalay Expressway.

Zimbabwe 
Zimbabwean milestones are constructed of cast concrete painted white with the kilometre distance indented and painted black.
There is no distinction between state and national road-sign markings. They were originally sited every 500 metres by the Rhodesian Ministry of Roads and Road Traffic, starting at zero from the largest town or city. In 1980, the Zimbabwean government began placing new markers 1 km apart and damaged or missing half kilometre markers were no longer replaced.

Railway mileposts 

The Railways Clauses Consolidation Act 1845 compels UK railway companies to provide their passengers with a means of determining the distance travelled (fares were set by distance at this time). Section 94 states:

Similar laws were passed in other countries. On the modern railway, these historical markers are still used as infrastructure reference points. At many points, the distances shown on the markers are based upon points no longer on the network – for example, distances measured via a closed line or from a junction which has subsequently been moved. Whole mileposts are usually supplemented by half and quarter posts. Structure signs often include the mileage to a fair degree of precision; in the UK, the chain (equal to ) is the usual accuracy. In the U.S. and Canada, miles are "decimalized", so that, for example, there may be a "milepost 4.83" to mark a junction, crossing, bridge or tunnel.

In metricated areas, the equivalent is the kilometric point.

Boundaries 

Surveyors place milestones to mark the boundaries between the jurisdictions separated by borders. A series of such boundary markers exists at one mile (1.6 km) intervals along the borders of the District of Columbia in the United States.

Gallery

See also 

Boundary marker
Exit number
Ichirizuka
Highway location marker
Kilometre zero
Milepost equation
Parting stone
Reassurance marker – a road sign with a route number, but no distance
Survey marker
Waymarking

References

External links 

Milestone in Ayrshire, Scotland
 The Milestone Society UK
 Mileposts and milestones on the Leeds Liverpool Canal
 milestones on the Thames & Severn Canal (and more than 41 other canals)
 map of milestones mid Gloucestershire UK (including old fingerposts)
 Article in Smith's Dictionary of Greek and Roman Antiquities with further links, including to a photograph of a Roman milestone in Orvieto
 Inventory of Roman milestones in France (in French)
 Section 2D.46 of the U.S. Manual on Uniform Traffic Control Devices
 MileStonesGurus, a weblog pictures project with only milestones with an equal KM point